San Juan Ñumí is a town and municipality in Oaxaca in south-western Mexico. The municipality covers an area of 43.38 km2. 
It is part of the Tlaxiaco District in the south of the Mixteca Region.

In 2005, the municipality had a population of 5,796.

References

Municipalities of Oaxaca